Prigorevo is a rural locality (a village) in Paustovskoye Rural Settlement, Vyaznikovsky District, Vladimir Oblast, Russia. The population was 11 as of 2010.

Geography 
Prigorevo is located on the Indrus River, 36 km south of Vyazniki (the district's administrative centre) by road. Sergiyevy-Gorki is the nearest rural locality.

References 

Rural localities in Vyaznikovsky District